Dobbins is an English surname and it may refer to: 

People
 Bill Dobbins
 Daniel Dobbins
 Debbie Dobbins
 Donald C. Dobbins
 Eugene Dobbins
 Ollie Dobbins
 Samuel A. Dobbins
 Tim Dobbins

Places
 Dobbins Air Reserve Base
 Dobbins, California
 Dobbins, Kentucky